Steve Duncan is an urban explorer based in New York City. He has extensively explored the New York City sewer system and other tunnels in the New York City area such as the New York City Subway System and Amtrak tunnels that run through the city. Steve has also explored sewers and underground infrastructure around the world. He has explored sewers and tunnels beneath Paris, London, Milan, Rome, Naples, Stockholm, Berlin, Moscow, Montreal, Toronto, Chicago and Los Angeles. He also hosted a television show on The Discovery Channel in 2005. The show aired for five episodes  and has since occasionally been aired in syndication.

Steve has been involved in attempting to map current day and historic sewers and tunnels. One of his most recent projects has been to map the development of storm drains in Los Angeles, California.

References

Photographers from New York City
Columbia University alumni
Living people
Year of birth missing (living people)